Sponger can refer to:

 The Spongers , a 1978 television play by Jim Allen
 A practitioner of sponge diving
 The mascot of Tarpon Springs High School
 A term used in Trencadís, a mosaic technique

See also
 Schnorrer, a Yiddish term for "sponger"
 Sponge (disambiguation)